Michael R. Mansell (January 15, 1858 in Auburn, New York – December 4, 1902 in Auburn, New York), was a professional baseball outfielder in the Major Leagues from 1879 to 1884. He played for the Syracuse Stars, Cincinnati Stars, Pittsburgh Alleghenys, Philadelphia Athletics, and Richmond Virginians. His brothers John and Tom also played professional baseball.

See also
List of Major League Baseball annual doubles leaders
List of Major League Baseball annual triples leaders

External links

Major League Baseball outfielders
Baseball players from New York (state)
19th-century baseball players
Richmond Virginians players
Cincinnati Reds (1876–1879) players
Syracuse Stars (NL) players
Pittsburgh Alleghenys players
Philadelphia Athletics (AA) players
1858 births
1902 deaths
Sportspeople from Auburn, New York
Syracuse Stars (minor league baseball) players
Washington Nationals (minor league) players
Albany (minor league baseball) players
Cleveland Forest Cities players
Oswego Sweegs players
Waterbury Brassmen players
Hamilton Hams players
Toronto Canucks players
Newark Little Giants players
Providence Clamdiggers (baseball) players
Utica Stars players